Film Authors' Studio (FAS) was a short-lived but influential Croatian film production studio. Established in 1967, it was the first independent feature film production company in Yugoslavia.

Sources

Mass media companies established in 1967
Mass media companies disestablished in 1973
Film production companies of Croatia
Cinema of Yugoslavia
1967 establishments in Croatia
1973 disestablishments in Croatia